Tham Hua Kalok (literally Skull Cave, also named Tham Phi Hua To ถ้ำผีหัวโต) is a cave in Ao Luek District near Phang Nga Bay in southern Thailand. The cave contains prehistoric paintings in black and red pigment of humans and strange animals. The cave is in Than Bok Khorani National Park.

See also 
 List of caves
 Speleology

References
Dorling Kindersley Thailand (2005)

Caves of Thailand
Geography of Krabi province
Prehistoric Thailand